Brittany Lyons is a beauty queen who represented Jamaica in Miss World 2008 in South Africa. She has an associate degree in business administration from the University of the Commonwealth Caribbean, and a Bachelors Degree from Florida International University. She was also awarded the Beach Beauty Title on the winning night. Brittany went on to represent Jamaica in the Miss World Competition in South Africa.

References

External links

1989 births
Living people
Miss World 2008 delegates
Jamaican beauty pageant winners
Jamaican people of European descent
People from Kingston, Jamaica